Alaska Broadcast Communications is a local radio broadcasting company, serving the entire southeastern area of Alaska. The main office, along with the Juneau studios, is located at the Juneau Radio Center, located at 3161 Channel Drive in Juneau, Alaska. 

The company owns and operates nine stations in three different markets:

Juneau

 KJNO AM 630
 KINY AM 800
 KXXJ AM 1330
 KTKU FM 105.1
 KSUP FM 106.3

Sitka (studios at 611 Lake Street)

 KIFW AM 1230
 KSBZ FM 103.1

Ketchikan  (studios at 526 Stedman Street)

 KTKN AM 930
 KGTW FM 106.7

References

Companies based in Juneau, Alaska
Radio broadcasting companies of the United States